Goodrington is a coastal village in Devon, England. Its beach is known as Goodrington Sands.

History
Goodrington is mentioned in the Domesday Book of AD 1086 as Godrintone in the ancient hundred of Kerswell. The village became part of Haytor Hundred when it was derived from Kerswell Hundred. In the 18th century the name was written as Goderington. In the late 19th century, the administrative functions of the hundred became a part of other units of government. In 1968 three councils were amalgamated, then since 1972 the Torbay Council provides many governmental services for Goodrington.

Goodrington has a railway station, on the Paignton and Dartmouth Steam Railway, a water park, three beaches, a park with boating lake, various shops and other facilities. To the south there is also a popular dog walking route running along the coast to Broadsands. This passes several fishing spots and "Sugarloaf", a large hill with a  view of the Bay. The village has two churches, St. George's (Anglican) and the Goodrington Methodist Church.

The main road in Goodrington is Dartmouth Road (A379) which is served by Stagecoach Devon service 12 between Brixham and Newton Abbot every 10 minutes. In addition Torbay Mini Buses operate service 25 between Paignton (Morrisons), and Roundham Road (close to Youngs Park) via the town centre on an hourly basis.

Environment
The village is home to the largest known Davey Elm in the UK. Goodrington Park and Youngs Park are now tended by a local group called Youngs Park People who keep the green in excellent condition with many planted areas.

References

Populated coastal places in Devon
Seaside resorts in England
Torbay